Kyung-won, also spelled Kyong-won, is a Korean unisex given name. Its meaning differs based on the hanja used to write each syllable of the name. There are 74 hanja with the reading "kyung" and 46 hanja with the reading "won" on the South Korean government's official list of hanja which may be registered for use in given names.

People with this name include:

Park Kyung-won (1901–1933), Korea's first female aviator
K. W. Lee (born 1928), Korean-born American male journalist
Kyongwon Ahn (born 1937), Korean-born American male taekwondo master
Na Kyung-won (born 1963), South Korean female politician and lawyer
Moon Kyungwon (born 1969), South Korean female artist
Lee Kyung-won (born 1980), South Korean female badminton player
Yoon Kyung-won (born 1982), South Korean male ice hockey player
Kwon Kyung-won (born 1992), South Korean male footballer

See also
List of Korean given names

References

External links
Page for the name "경원" on erumy.com

Korean unisex given names